Crocanthes thalamectis is a moth in the family Lecithoceridae. It was described by Edward Meyrick in 1929. It is found on New Guinea.

References

Moths described in 1929
Crocanthes